"This Is What You Came For" is a song by Scottish DJ Calvin Harris featuring Barbadian singer Rihanna. It was released on 29 April 2016, through Columbia Records and Westbury Road. American singer-songwriter Taylor Swift, initially credited with the pseudonym Nils Sjöberg, wrote the song and composed with Harris, who produced with Kuk Harrell. Rihanna and Harris had previously collaborated on her sixth studio album, Talk That Talk, which included the international chart-topper "We Found Love" and US top five single "Where Have You Been", the former of which was written and produced by Harris. He played the final version for Rihanna at the 2016 Coachella Music Festival. It was also played at the 2018 FIFA World Cup Final after the conclusion of the match.

The single debuted at number two on the UK Singles Chart. It peaked at number three on the US Billboard Hot 100, becoming Rihanna's 21st top-five song and Harris's second; the song is currently Harris's highest-peaking single as a lead artist in the US. It became Rihanna's 25th and Harris's fourth chart-topper on the Dance Club Songs and also reached number one on the US Hot Dance/Electronic Songs; the single became the 12th number one for Rihanna and Harris's tenth on the sister chart Dance/Mix Show Airplay. It topped the charts in Australia, Canada and Ireland, and peaked within the top ten in Germany, New Zealand and Switzerland. A music video for the song premiered on 17 June 2016 and features Rihanna in an open cube with images projected on the inside walls.

Writing and release

Calvin Harris presented the final recording to Rihanna, two weeks prior to its release. During his performance at Coachella, Harris shared the song with Rihanna and her manager in her trailer. Harris stated that he was "nervous" to play her the song because he had "changed so many bits from when she first heard it." The song was released on 29 April 2016. The song marks the pair's third collaboration, following the global chart-topper "We Found Love" and the Billboard Hot 100 top-five single "Where Have You Been", which are both featured on Rihanna's sixth studio album, Talk That Talk (2011).

Harris and Nils Sjöberg were credited as songwriters and producers. On 13 July 2016, tabloid website TMZ reported that the track was written by Harris's then-girlfriend, American singer-songwriter Taylor Swift, who used the pseudonym Nils Sjöberg because they did not want their relationship to overshadow the song. The track became a point of contention upon its release when Harris—in response to being asked about the possibility of collaborating with Swift during an interview with Ryan Seacrest—said that he "can't see it happening." Harris eventually confirmed on his Twitter account that Swift wrote the lyrics and contributed some background vocals, while he "wrote the music, produced the song, arranged it and cut [Rihanna's] vocals". He also confirmed Swift's previous request for secrecy as co-writer. The credit has since been officially changed to "Taylor Swift" in BMI's and ASCAP's entry for the song.

On March 1, 2023, various unreleased songs of Swift's leaked online, including her full original demo recording of "This Is What You Came For".

Composition

"This Is What You Came For" is an EDM and house song. Gil Kaufman of Billboard stated that the song is "a chilled-out, joyful club track that nods to classic Chicago house from the late 1980s and early 1990s, but with a modern, poppier flavor." The song is written in the key of C major with a tempo of 124 beats per minute. The song follows a chord progression of Am–Fmaj7–G–C, and Rihanna's vocals span from G3 to E5, amounting to 2 different octaves.

Reception

Critical
"This Is What You Came For" received mixed reviews. Lary Barleet from NME stated that "As it builds to a climax, he pulls it right back, eschewing the EDM drop in favour of voguish and mellow tropical house. It will definitely be a hit, however by manipulating her voice so much he's stripped away the personality that made 'We Found Love' such a standout, and her latest album Anti so compelling. The result is surprisingly soulless." Robbie Daw from the Idolator gave the song a positive review, stating, "The song is pretty decent Euro-centric dance floor fodder. It's just a bit subdued-which might have been the correct decision; why attempt to top a pop classic and fail when you can zig left, aiming for other territory altogether?"

Commercial
"This Is What You Came For" debuted at number two on the UK Singles Chart. The single debuted at number nine on the US Billboard Hot 100 and later peaked at number three on the chart, becoming Rihanna's 28th top ten hit in the US, Harris's fourth, while on the magazine's Dance/Mix Show Airplay it extended Rihanna's number-one streak on that chart to 12 (the most of any artist on that chart) and gave Harris his tenth (the most among male artists, but at the same time extended his most weeks at number one on the chart among artists to 73). "This Is What You Came For" became Rihanna's 25th and Harris's fourth number one on the Hot Dance Club Songs Chart, where it became the first song since 2013's "Wake Me Up" to stay at number one for two weeks. As of October 2016, the single has sold 1.2 million copies in the United States.

"This Is What You Came For" debuted at number one on the Scottish Singles Chart, and peaked at number one in Australia, Canada and Ireland. The song also reached the top 10 in Germany, Ireland, New Zealand, Switzerland, Belgium, Denmark, Finland, France, Hungary, Italy, the Netherlands, Norway, Portugal and Slovakia. The song has reached the top 10 in all except three of the countries it has charted in.

Music video
The official music video for the song directed by Emil Nava with Director of Photography Martin Coppen and edited by Ellie Johnson, was released to YouTube on 16 June 2016. In it, a giant white box is shown sitting in a variety of places, such as a misty field and a forest. The scene then cuts to Rihanna, dressed in a sparkly blue jumpsuit, singing while standing and dancing inside the box. While she performs, graphics are projected onto all 5 sides around her. Lasers were the only other effects used with the video projections, and were provided by Dynamic FX. These include a variety of video effects and designs, footage of a crowd partying and running horses, and a drawing of a mountain with lightning over it. The video technology used for projections blended all angles of the backing video, so it would be displayed without skewing the image and allowing it to play back in a 3D environment. This new technology was being used for the first time on this video. This video also had many scenes and different cube designs cut from it, as the filming was cut short due to time constrains. Calvin Harris makes a brief cameo appearance in the video, driving a sports car (Lamborghini Aventador).  As the video ends, Rihanna walks outside, revealing the box has been set up on a dark, deserted soundstage. Two months after its release, the video reached 500 million views, and on 29 November 2016, the video reached one billion views. As of September 2022, it has reached 2.6 billion views, and is the site's 35th most viewed video.

Live performances
Taylor Swift performed "This is What You Came For" on the piano for the first time live at the United States Grand Prix in Austin, Texas, on 22 October 2016. Swift then performed an acoustic guitar version at the DirecTV Super Saturday Night in Houston, Texas, on 4 February 2017. Rihanna has not performed the song live.

Credits and personnel 
Credits adapted from Tidal. 
 Calvin Harris – producer, songwriter, mixing engineer
 Taylor Swift – songwriter, backing vocals
 Rihanna – vocals
 Kuk Harrell – producer
 Mike Marsh – mastering engineer
 Marcos Tovar – recording engineer

Track listing
Digital download
 "This Is What You Came For" (featuring Rihanna)  – 3:41

Digital download – Remixes
 "This Is What You Came For" (featuring Rihanna) (Extended Mix)  – 4:47
 "This Is What You Came For" (featuring Rihanna) (Dillon Francis Remix)  – 3:43
 "This Is What You Came For" (featuring Rihanna) (R3hab vs Henry Fong Remix)  – 4:18
 "This Is What You Came For" (featuring Rihanna) (R3hab Remix)  – 2:30
 "This Is What You Came For" (featuring Rihanna) (Grandtheft Remix)  – 3:01
 "This Is What You Came For" (featuring Rihanna) (Tony Junior Remix)  – 3:35
 "This Is What You Came For" (featuring Rihanna) (Bobby Puma Remix)  – 4:44

Charts

Weekly charts

Year-end charts

Decade-end charts

Certifications

Release history

See also

 List of best-selling singles in Australia
 List of number-one singles of 2016 (Australia)
 List of number-one singles of 2016 (Ireland)
 List of number-one singles of 2016 (Scotland)
 List of UK top 10 singles in 2016
 List of UK Dance Singles Chart number ones of 2016
 List of Billboard Hot 100 top 10 singles in 2016
 List of number-one dance singles of 2016 (U.S.)

References

2016 singles
2016 songs
Calvin Harris songs
Canadian Hot 100 number-one singles
Columbia Records singles
Irish Singles Chart number-one singles
MTV Video Music Award for Best Male Video
Number-one singles in Australia
Number-one singles in Hungary
Number-one singles in Israel
Number-one singles in Scotland
Rihanna songs
Song recordings produced by Kuk Harrell
Songs written by Calvin Harris
Songs written by Taylor Swift
Works published under a pseudonym